A storytelling game is a game where multiple players collaborate on telling a spontaneous story. Usually, each player takes care of one or more characters in the developing story. Some games in the tradition of role-playing games require one participant to take the roles of the various supporting characters, as well as introducing non-character forces (for example, a flood), but other systems dispense with this figure and distribute this function among all players.

Since this person usually sets the ground and setting for the story, he or she is often referred to as the "storyteller" (often contracted to "ST") or "narrator". Any number of other alternate forms may be used, many of which are variations on the term "gamemaster"; these variants are especially common in storytelling games derived from or similar to role-playing games.

In contrast to improv theater, storytelling gamers describe the actions of their characters rather than acting them out, except during dialogue or, in some games, monologue. However, live action versions exist, which are very much akin to theater except in the crucial absence of a non-participating audience.

Role-playing games
The most popular modern storytelling games originated as a subgenre of role-playing games, where the game rules and statistics are heavily de-emphasised in favor of creating a believable story and immersive experience for all involved. So while in a conventional game the announcement that one's character is going to leap over a seven-meters-wide canyon will be greeted with the request to roll a number of dice, a player in a storytelling game who wishes to have a character perform a similar feat will have to convince the others (especially the storyteller) why it is both probable and keeping within the established traits of their character to successfully do so. As such, these games are a subclass of diceless role-playing games.

Not all players find the storytelling style of role-playing satisfying. Many role-playing gamers are more comfortable in a system that gives them less freedom, but where they do not need to police themselves; others find it easier to enjoy a system where a more concrete framework of rules is already present. These three types of player are discussed by the GNS theory.

Some role-playing game systems which describe themselves as "storytelling games" nevertheless use randomisers rather than story in the arbitration of the rules, often in the form of a contest of Rock, Paper, Scissors or a card drawn from a deck of cards. Such "storytelling" games are instead simplified or streamlined forms of traditional role-playing games. Conversely, most modern role-playing games encourage gamemasters to ignore their gaming systems if it makes for a more enjoyable story, even though they may not describe themselves as "storytelling" games.

A growing number of websites utilize a bulletin board system, in which the gaming is akin to Collaborative Fiction but known as a "Literary Role-Playing Game". The players contribute to an ongoing story with defined parameters but no narrator or directing force.  A 'moderator' may oversee the gamers to ensure that the rules, guidelines and parameters of the gaming "world" are being upheld, but otherwise the writers are free to interact as players in an improvisational play.  Many of these "Literary RPGs" are fan-fiction based, such as (most prevalently) Tolkien's Middle-earth, Star Wars, Harry Potter, Twilight, any number of anime and manga sources, or they are simply based in thematic worlds such as the mythologies of Ancient Greece, fairy tales, the Renaissance or science fiction.  Most often referred to as "Literary RPGs" and place a greater emphasis on writing skill and storytelling ability than on any sense of competition driven outcome.

White Wolf Game Studio's Storyteller System, which is used in World of Darkness role-playing games such as Vampire: The Masquerade and live-action games under the Mind's Eye Theatre imprint, is the best-known and most popular role-playing game described as a "storytelling game".

Alternate form role-playing games
An early design of a collaborative storytelling game not based in simulation was created by Chris Engle c. 1988 with his Matrix Game. In this system, a referee decides the likeliness of the facts proposed by the players, and those facts happen or are rejected according with a dice roll. Players can propose counter-arguments that are resolved in a dice rolling contest. A conflict round can follow to resolve any inconsistencies or further detail new plot points. Matrix Games are now presented in a board game format.

In 1999, game designer Ian Millington developed an early work called Ergo which established the basis for collaborative role-playing. It was designed with the rules of the Fudge universal role-playing system in mind but added modifications necessary to get rid of the need for a gamemaster, distributing the responsibility for the game and story equally among all players and undoing the equivalence between player and character.

Modern rule systems (such as the coin system in Universalis) rely less on randomness and more in collaboration between players. This includes rules based on economic systems that force players to negotiate the details of the story, and solve conflicts based on the importance that they give to a given plot element and the resources they're willing to spend to make it into the story.

Collaborative fiction

Collaborative fiction is a form of storytelling which uses collaborative writing as the primary medium, where a group of authors share creative control of a story. Collaborative fiction can occur for commercial gain, as part of education, or recreationally – many collaboratively written works have been the subject of a large degree of academic research.

See also
 Letter game
 Round-robin story
 Lexicon, combining a "Letter Game" and "collaborative fiction" in the form of an encyclopedia.
 Make believe
 Mind's Eye Theatre
 New Worlds Project, an online interactive storytelling game
 Once Upon a Time, a card game about creating fairy tales
 Universalis

References

Game terminology
Role-playing game terminology
Storytelling